= Tattaios =

Town of ancient Bithynia

Coordinates: 40°17′13″N 30°20′35″E

Tattaios was a town of ancient Bithynia, inhabited in Roman and Byzantine times.

Its site is located near Arıcaklar, Asiatic Turkey.
